The D2G reactor was a naval reactor used by the United States Navy from 1962 to provide  propulsion and electricity generation on warships. Ships powered by the reactor were decommissioned at around the end of the 20th century. The D2G designation stands for:

 D = Destroyer platform
 2 = Second generation core designed by the contractor
 G = General Electric was the contracted designer

History 
Two of these nuclear reactors were installed on each of the Bainbridge, Truxtun, California, and Virginia classes of guided missile cruisers. The only nuclear-powered cruiser in the United States Navy not equipped with a D2G reactor was the world's first nuclear cruiser, the USS Long Beach (CGN-9), which used two C1W reactors.

It is known that USS Bainbridge's reactors were refueled three times, and USS Truxtun's were refueled twice.

Operation
One reactor was located in the aft of the hull, the other in the fore. The reactors of the California class ships were replaced by  D2W reactors in the early 1990s.

References

United States naval reactors